Nigel Henbest  (born 1951) is a British astronomer, born in Manchester and educated in Northern Ireland and at Leicester University, where he studied physics, chemistry and astronomy. He did postgraduate research at the University of Cambridge before becoming a freelance science writer. He has written more than 40 books, many in collaboration with Heather Couper, and over 1,000 articles on astronomy and space which have been translated into 27 languages. Previously he has been Astronomy Consultant to New Scientist magazine, editor of the Journal of the British Astronomical Association and media consultant to the Royal Greenwich Observatory. Along with Couper and Stuart Carter, director of the Channel 4 series The Stars, he set up Pioneer Productions where he produced award-winning television programmes and series. Asteroid 3795 Nigel is named after him.

Early life and education 
Nigel Henbest was born on 6 May 1951 in West Didsbury, Manchester, where he lived for the first five years of his life. His father, Bernard Henbest, was an organic chemist and his mother, Rosalind (née James) a psychiatrist. In 1958, his father was appointed Professor of Organic Chemistry at Queen’s University in Belfast, and Henbest was educated at the Royal Belfast Academical Institution until the age of 18.

Henbest graduated from the University of Leicester in 1972, gaining a First Class honours BSc in astrophysics. Here, he met fellow astronomy student Heather Couper; they formed a working partnership - Hencoup Enterprises - that focuses on astronomy popularisation.

Research 
Moving to St John’s College, Cambridge, Henbest researched at the Cavendish Laboratory, under the then Astronomer Royal, Sir Martin Ryle. During 1972-73 Henbest made pioneering observations of the remnant of Tycho’s Supernova (observed by Tycho Brahe in 1572). Then in 1974 he published the first comprehensive observations of quasars and galaxies made with the newly opened Five Kilometre Telescope, now named the Ryle Telescope.

Henbest also researched the optical spectra of quasars at the Royal Greenwich Observatory, before returning to the Department of Geology at Leicester University, to develop and install tiltmeters and a recording seismometer on the active volcano Mount Etna

He has also presented research on ancient astronomical observations to the European Association of Archaeologists

Henbest is now an Honorary Professor in the Duncan of Jordanstone College of Art and Design, University of Dundee.

Career 
With the publication of his first major book, The Exploding Universe, in 1979 Henbest began a lifelong career as a science communicator - specialising in astronomy and space - across media platforms ranging from magazines and newspapers to radio, television and online.

Books and magazines 
Henbest has written over 40 books, many written jointly with Heather Couper. Henbest and Couper are ‘unsung heroes of astronomy, great storytellers years ahead of their time and with an eye for a colourful character’

As well his contributions to major encyclopedias, Henbest has had over 1,000 articles published in international magazines.

In 1982, Henbest was appointed Astronomy Consultant to New Scientist, a post he held for ten years. He has also been a columnist for BBC Focus magazine and The Independent newspaper.

Plays 
In 1989, Lord Bernard and Lady Josephine Miles invited Henbest to write a play for the Molecule Theatre of Science. Co-authored by Mike Bennett, It’s All in the Stars! was staged at the Bloomsbury and Mermaid Theatres in London, and toured nationally.

Consultancy and editorships 
In 1982, Henbest was appointed Media Consultant to the Royal Greenwich Observatory, with special responsibility for publicising the new Roque de los Muchachos Observatory on La Palma and the opening of the 4.2 m William Herschel Telescope.

The Open University invited Henbest to serve as External Assessor on its new Astronomy module, Matter in the Universe (S256), in 1984.

As well as editing books and magazine supplements, Henbest was appointed as Editor of the Journal of the  British Astronomical Association in 1985, redesigning and revitalising the publication.

Henbest was Chairman of National Astronomy Week in 1990, which spearheaded the first national campaign against light pollution in the UK.

Eclipses 
As guest astronomer, Henbest has led eight expeditions to view total eclipses of the Sun: Sumatra (1988), Hawaii (1991), Aruba (1998), Alderney (1999), Egypt (2006), China (2009), Tahiti (2010) and Idaho, USA (2017).

Personal appearances 
Henbest has given presentations around the world, from Australia to Colombia and China, as well as on cruise liners including the Queen Mary 2. He has also led tours of major space centres, from the Apollo Mission Control in Houston to the futurist Spaceport America in New Mexico.

Online 
Henbest presents the regular strand Nigel goes to Space! on the YouTube channel Naked Science.

Radio and television appearances 
As an astronomy and space expert, Henbest has appeared on BBC Radio 2, Radio 4, Radio 5Live, Radio Scotland, Radio Wales, British Forces Broadcasting Service and many local UK radio stations. For the BBC World Service, he has filed location reports on solar eclipses, the repair of Hubble Space Telescope and spacecraft encounters with planets and comets.

He has also been:
 Chairman of The Litmus Test, BBC Radio 4, 1991-93
 Presenter (with Heather Couper) of Seeing Stars, BBC World Service, 1989-2001

As well as being interviewed about breaking news stories on British television channels, Henbest has featured on several major international TV documentary series:
 2000's Greatest Tragedies, National Geographic Channel, 2015
 The 80's Greatest Tragedies, National Geographic Channel, 2014
 Meteor Strike, Fireball from Space, Channel 4, 2013
 UFO Europe Untold Stories, National Geographic Channel

Henbest was a member of the University of Leicester’s winning team on Christmas University Challenge, BBC2, 30 December 2013.

Television production and scriptwriting 
In 1983, Henbest conceived a TV documentary on the pioneering Infrared Astronomical Satellite, which was filmed by Quanta production company  and screened in the BBC television Horizon strand.
 
Henbest was consultant on the television series The Planets and The Stars, presented by Heather Couper in 1985 and 1988 on Channel 4. With Couper and the director of The Stars series, Stuart Carter, Henbest set up Pioneer Productions later in 1988. Here Henbest wrote and produced TV programmes and series for both British and American broadcasters. They garnered many documentary awards, including four Gold Medals and a Grand Award at the New York Festivals. For Universe: Beyond the Millennium, Henbest won the Glaxo-Wellcome/ABSW Science Writers Award for 1999.
He also delivers presentations on Astronomy and Television at international conferences.

Astronaut
In 2009, Henbest signed up with Virgin Galactic for a suborbital flight into space, launching in SpaceShipTwo from the world’s first purpose-built commercial spaceport Spaceport America.

As an ambassador for private human spaceflight, Henbest has appeared in Forbes magazine  and presents Nigel Goes to Space! on YouTube

Bibliography

Books
 Space Frontiers, 1978, Woodpecker, 
 Exploding Universe, 1979, Marshall Cavendish, 
 Spotter's Guide to the Night Sky, 1979, Usborne, 
 The Mysterious Universe, 1981, Ebury, 
 The Restless Universe, 1982, George Philip, 
 The New Astronomy, 1983, Cambridge University Press, 
 Astronomy, 1983, Franklin Watts, 
 Physics, 1983, Franklin Watts, 
 Observing the Universe (ed.), 1984, Blackwell/New Scientist, ; hardback  paperback
 Comets, Stars and Planets, 1985, Bookthrift, 
 The Planets, 1985, Pan, 
 Halley's Comet (ed.), 1985, New Science Publications, 
 The Sun (Space Scientist), 1986, Franklin Watts,  UK;  US
 The Moon (Space Scientist), 1986, Franklin Watts,  UK;  US
 Galaxies and Quasars (Space Scientist), 1986, Franklin Watts,  UK;  US
 Telescopes and Observatories (Space Scientist), 1987, Franklin Watts,  UK;  US
 Spaceprobes and Satellites (Space Scientist), 1987, Franklin Watts,  UK;  US
 The Stars, 1988, Pan, 
 The Planets, 1992, Viking, 
 The Space Atlas, 1992, Dorling Kindersley, 
 The Universe, 1992, Weidenfeld & Nicolson, 
 Space Shuttle Discovery, 1993, Channel 4 Books, 
 How the Universe Works, 1994, Dorling Kindersley, 
 Guide to the Galaxy, 1994, Cambridge University Press, 
 The Planets: Portraits of New Worlds, 1994, Penguin, 
 Black Holes, 1996, Dorling Kindersley, 
 The New Astronomy - completely revised second edition, 1996, Cambridge University Press,  hardback;  paperback
 Black Holes, 1997, Channel 4 Books, 
 Big Bang, 1997, Dorling Kindersley, 
 Is Anybody Out There?, 1998, Dorling Kindersley, 
 To the Ends of the Universe, 1998, Dorling Kindersley, 
 Universe, 1999, Channel 4 Books,  hardback;  paperback
 Planets, 1999, Ladybird, 
 Space Encyclopedia, 1999, Dorling Kindersley, 
 Space Hopping: The Planets as You've Never Seen Them Before!, 1999, Egmont, 
 Extreme Universe, 2001, Channel 4 Books, 
 Mars: The Inside Story of the Red Planet, 2001, Headline, 
 Encyclopedia of Space, 2003, Dorling Kindersley, 
 The History of Astronomy, 2009, Cassell Illustrated (UK), ; Firefly (US), 
 The Story of Astronomy, 2011, Cassell, 
 The Astronomy Bible: The Definitive Guide to the Night Sky and the Universe, 2015, Firefly (US), ; Philip's (UK), 
 The Secret Life of Space, 2015, Aurum, 
 Space Visual Encyclopaedia, 2016, Dorling Kindersley, 
 The Universe Explained: A Cosmic Q&A, 2018, Firefly, 
 2022 Stargazing, 2021, Philip's,

Contributor 
 Illustrated Encyclopedia of Astronomy and Space, 1976, ed. Ian Ridpath, Macmillan 
 Encyclopedia of Space Travel and Astronomy, 1979, ed. John Man, Octopus 
 Longman New Universal Dictionary, 1982, ed. Paul Procter, Longman  
 Encyclopædia Britannica, 1985 Fifteenth Edition, second version, (1985) 
 How is it Done?, 1990, Reader's Digest 
 Images of the Universe, 1991, ed. Carole Stott, Cambridge University Press 
 Science Encyclopedia, 1993, Dorling Kindersley 
 Astronomy Communication, 2003, edd. André Heck and Claus Madsen, Kluwer 
 Communicating Astronomy, 2005, ed. T.J. Mahoney, Instituto de Astrofísica de Canarias 
 Nothing: From Absolute Zero to Cosmic Oblivion, Amazing Insights into Nothingness, 2013, New Scientist/Profile 
 The Reducatarian Solution, 2017, ed. Brian Kateman, TarcherPerigee

Magazines 
 Columnist for The Independent newspaper 
 BBC Focus magazine
 New Scientist magazine

Television productions

Honours and awards 
 DSc (Hon) University of Leicester
 Fellow of the Royal Astronomical Society
 Winner of the Glaxo-Wellcome/ABSW Science Writers Award, 1999.
 Minor planet 3795 Nigel, discovered by Eleanor Helin, is named in his honor.

References

External links
Nigel Henbest's website
National Geographic Channel press release for "The Human Ape"
A podcast on astrotalkuk.org talking about his new book History of Astronomy
Naked Science YouTube channel
Nigel Henbest at Amazon.co.uk
Nigel Henbest at Amazon.com
Nigel Henbest on Astronomy Now
Nigel Henbest on The Independent

1951 births
Alumni of the University of Leicester
Living people
20th-century British astronomers
21st-century British astronomers